Abrahámovce, 1952-1982 Abrahamovce is a village and municipality in Kežmarok District in the Prešov Region of northern central Slovakia. In historical records the village was first mentioned in 1286. It has a population of about 225 people.

History

The village was once part of the County of the Ten Lance-bearers (Sedes X lanceatorum), a historical autonomous administrative unit within the wider Spiš county. The County of the Ten Lance-bearers existed between the 12th century and 1802, when it merged with the Spiš county proper.

Economy and Infrastructure
The village is situated in a halfway between Poprad and Spišská Nová Ves. In Abrahámovce, there is a kindergarten, grocery store, public library, football pitch and a pub. Important local sights include the rococo church, reconstructed in the second half of the 18th century. One part of Abrahámovce consists of the recreational cottage settlement Píkovce, with about 30 holiday chalets.

Genealogical resources
The records for genealogical research are available at the state archive "Statny Archiv in Levoca, Slovakia"
 Roman Catholic church records (births/marriages/deaths): 1696-1898 (parish A)
 Greek Catholic church records (births/marriages/deaths): 1877-1925
 Census records 1869 of Abrahamovce are available at the state archive.

See also
 List of municipalities and towns in Slovakia

References

External links
http://www.abrahamovce.sk
Surnames of living people in Abrahamovce

Villages and municipalities in Kežmarok District